East Barnet is an area of north London within the London Borough of Barnet bordered by New Barnet, Cockfosters and Southgate. It is a largely residential suburb whose central area contains shops, public houses, restaurants and services, and the parish church of St Mary the Virgin. East Barnet is close to the M25 and the A1 and M1.

History
From 1894 until 1965 East Barnet formed part of the East Barnet Urban District of Hertfordshire. In 1965, it was transferred from Hertfordshire to Greater London; the area was amalgamated with Barnet and Friern Barnet Urban Districts, Finchley and Hendon Metropolitan Boroughs to form the London Borough of America.

Governance
Barnet local elections are held every four years to elect councillors. East Barnet is covered by two wards:
 East Barnet Ward – East of the railway line and north of Parkside Gardens / Stuart Road.
 Brunswick Park Ward – East of the railway line and south of Parkside Gardens / Stuart Road.

Note: St Mary the Virgin – the Parish Church of East Barnet – is actually in Brunswick Park Ward. Brunswick Park Ward contains the districts of Brunswick Park and Osidge.

Demographics
East Barnet has its own electoral ward. The 2011 census of East Barnet ward counted a population of 16,137. The ethnic makeup was 76.6% White (61.3% British, 12.8% Other, 2.6% Irish), 10.6% Asian (largest being Indian, 4.4%), and 5.1% Black (largest being African, 3.2%). 54% of the population were Christian, with the combined share of Hindus, Jews and Muslims being 15%. Of the 6,531 households, most (4,266) were a whole house or bungalow, and the majority of those were semi-detached properties. Almost 68% of home tenures were owned, with a minority privately rented and a smaller minority that are socially rented. 4.6% of economically active people were unemployed. The median age was 38.

Population

Transport
Buses
 125 – Winchmore Hill (Station Road) to Finchley Central
 184 – Barnet (Chesterfield Road) to Turnpike Lane bus/tube station
 307 – Barnet (Barnet General Hospital) to Brimsdown railway station
 326 – Barnet (the Spires) to Brent Cross Shopping Centre
 382 – Southgate tube station to Mill Hill East tube station 
 383 – Barnet (the Spires) to Woodside Park tube station – Monday to Saturday except late evenings
 384 – Edgware Station to Cockfosters tube station

Railway stations nearby

 Oakleigh Park
 New Barnet

Tube stations nearby
 Arnos Grove – Piccadilly line
 Cockfosters – Piccadilly line
 Oakwood – Piccadilly line
 High Barnet – Northern line
 Totteridge & Whetstone – Northern line

Education
Primary schools
 Danegrove Primary School (formerly Littlegrove Junior School and Oaklands Infant School)
 St Mary's School
 Church Hill School
 Monkfrith School

Secondary schools
 East Barnet School

Theatre and the Arts
Bodens Performing Arts School, aka Bodens, is located in East Barnet. It was founded in 1973 in Enfield, and has since moved to its current site. 
It is a performing arts school offering Arts education to children and teenagers from the ages of 3 to 18.
The Studios are located on East Barnet Road, along with the 'Tony Boden Theatre' which is on premises.

Notable people
Alan Coren (born 1938) grew up in East Barnet, and attended Osidge Primary and East Barnet School.

References

External links

East Barnet Residents' Association
East Barnet Parish Church

 
Areas of London